Hawea or Hāwea can refer to:

Lake Hāwea, a lake in New Zealand
Lake Hāwea (town), a settlement beside the lake
Hāwea River, a river in New Zealand
Hāwea Conservation Park, a protected area in New Zealand
Hāwea / Bligh Sound, a fiord in New Zealand
HMNZS Hawea, three ships of the Royal New Zealand Navy
Hawea Mataira, a dual-code rugby football player who represented New Zealand